Handen (also known as Haninge Centrum) is a part of Metropolitan Stockholm and the seat of Haninge Municipality (Haninge Kommun) in Stockholm County in eastern Sweden. Handen had around 15 092 inhabitants in 2018.

Geographically and statistically Handen is a part of the Stockholm urban area. Handen has a station on the Stockholm commuter rail system and a large bus station serving great areas of Södertörn.

Handen is where the municipality seat of Haninge is located. Haninge's major shopping center, Haninge Centrum, and the joint campus of KTH and Södertörns Högskola are also located here.

The Övre Rudasjön lake is located just west of the commercial center.

References

Metropolitan Stockholm
Stockholm urban area
Municipal seats of Stockholm County
Swedish municipal seats
Populated places in Haninge Municipality